The Russian presidential inauguration is a ceremony to mark the start of a term of a President of Russia. The president's term is six years (formerly four years). In the case of extraordinary election, the inauguration is conducted thirty days after the announcement of the official election results by the Central Election Commission of Russia. Since Vladimir Putin's first inauguration in 2000, the ceremony took place in the Grand Kremlin Palace of the Moscow Kremlin. The inauguration ceremony of the Russian president has traditionally been accompanied by the festive prayer service of the Patriarch of Moscow and all Rus', which dates back to 1498, when the first wedding took place for the reign of Prince Dmitry Ivanovich, the grandson of Ivan III.

Traditions
The following people are usually present at the inauguration:
 Members of the Federation Council of Russia
 State Duma deputies
 The judges of the Constitutional Court
 Heads of diplomatic missions
 Representatives of the Government of the Russian Federation and federal authorities
 Diplomatic corps

The ceremony in the Grand Kremlin Palace begins (since 2008) when the Presidential Band of the Russian Federation from the Kremlin Regiment plays the Festival Coronation March by Pyotr Ilyich Tchaikovsky.

The Ceremony
The inauguration proper starts with the outgoing President reviewing the Kremlin Regiment for one last time as President and Supreme Commander of the uniformed forces of the Federation in Cathedral Square and he then walks towards the Grand Kremlin Palace.

The President-elect's procession arrives at the Grand Kremlin Palace through the Spassky Gate. The President-elect passes through St. George's Hall and St. Andrews's Hall into Alexander Hall, which holds the flags of the Russian Standard of the President and the Emblem of the Russian president. The Chairman of the Constitutional Court of Russia and the Chairmen of both chambers of the Federal Assembly sit at a raised platform where the President-elect joins them. The Chairman of the Constitutional Court places both a copy of Constitution and the President's Chain of Office on the rostrum. After the outgoing President makes his address, the Chairman of the Constitutional Court of Russia then asks the President-elect to take the oath of office.

The president-elect places his right hand on the Constitution of the Russian Federation and recites the presidential oath. The Chairman of the Constitutional Court then gives the President the chain of office and proclaims the inauguration of a new President. After the new president is inaugurated the Russian national anthem is played and the standard of the head of state is raised at the dome of the presidential residence. This is followed by the new President's speech and as the speech ends and the new President leaves the halls "Slavsya" by Mikhail Glinka from his first opera A Life for the Tsar is played by the military band as a 21-gun salute is fired.

As the inauguration has been held every 4 and now 6 years on 7 May, the anniversary of the raising of the Kremlin Regiment, the ceremony ends in Cathedral Square with both the outgoing and incoming presidents attending the latter's 1st inspection of the regiment as the Supreme Commander-in-Chief of the Russian Armed Forces, greeting it on its anniversary. It is then followed by the marchpart of the entire regiment assembled.

The Oath

At the same time Boris Yeltsin in 1991 and Alexander Rutskoy in 1993 was read another text of the oath:

List of inaugural ceremonies

See also
 United States presidential inauguration

References

External links
 Official site of the President of Russia
 The Russian tradition of the presidential inauguration in Russian
 The Process of the presidential inauguration ceremony (in Russian)

May events
Politics of Russia
Government of Russia
 
Ceremonies in Russia
Articles containing video clips